TRNC Directorate of Religious Affairs is the institution responsible for carrying out works related to faith, worship and moral principles of Islam; enlightening the society about religion, and managing places of worship in the Turkish Republic of Northern Cyprus. The Directorate of Religious Affairs of the island falls under the umbrella of the Directorate of Religious Affairs of Turkey. The Directorate provides services in the five districts of the TRNC: Nicosia, Famagusta, Girne, Güzelyurt, İskele, as well as Lefke and Republic of Cyprus.

As of 2021, the chairman is Prof. Dr. Ahmet Ünsal.

References

External links 
 Official website

See also 
 Diyanet Center of America

Organisations based in Cyprus
Organisations based in Northern Cyprus
Islam in Cyprus